The Findern Manuscript (CUL MS Ff.1.6) is a paper codex written entirely in Middle English and compiled in the fifteenth and early sixteenth centuries by a series of gentry who were neighbors in the countryside of Derbyshire. A list of its major texts creates a “greatest hits” of fourteenth-century secular love literature; however the volume also contains around two dozen anonymous lyrics, which have been added in the blank spaces left at the bottoms of pages and the ends of quires.  There are several names and scribal signatures written into the book, including the names of five women.

Contents of the Manuscript

References

Middle English literature
Courtly love
Manuscripts in Cambridge